Sergey Alekseevich Osipenko (born March 6, 1970), known as The Rossoshansky Maniac, is a Kazakhstani-Russian serial killer and rapist. From 2005 to 2006, he murdered 4 girls and women in the Voronezh Oblast.

Biography 
In the 1990s, he worked in the Ministry of Internal Affairs of Kazakhstan. In 1999, Osipenko moved from his native Kazakhstan to the city of Rossosh, settling on the market to sell products to other vendors. He was fond of psychology and criminology, was married, and had a daughter.

Osipenko committed the murders in a pattern: he would follow his victim, who lived in five-storey houses on the upper floors, go into the apartment with them, then rape and kill the owner, before plundering the place.

On January 24, 2005, in Rossosh, Osipenko killed his first victim, 17-year-old Anna Berezhnaya. The killer attacked her as soon as she entered her apartment, beating the girl and threatening her with a knife. He then forced her to go to the bedroom, cut off her clothes, taping her mouth with a plaster, raping and finally killing her with a piece of metal pipe.

On August 17, 2005, in Voronezh, he raped and killed 38-year-old Elena Meleshko.

On January 25, 2006, in Voronezh, Osipenko attacked 15-year-old Anna Pobedinskaya, who was returning from school, raping and then killing her.

On March 6, 2006, in Rossosh, he raped and killed 13-year-old Yulia Yatskaya, who lived in the same neighborhood as Berezhnaya.

There was a witness who saw Osipenko on the day of Yatskaya's murder, drawing attention to his short height of 167 cm.

The killer planned to leave for Kazakhstan, but on April 6, 2006, he was detained at a railway station in the Kurgan Oblast. He did not resist arrest, and spoke freely of his crimes.

In late September 2006, the Voronezh Regional Prosecutor's Office forwarded the Osipenko case, consisting of 16 volumes, to the court. He requested that his case be tried by jury, in the hope of gaining leniency and avoiding life imprisonment. But on December 7, the Voronezh Regional Court delivered a verdict, according to which Osipenko was found guilty and did not deserve leniency. On December 14, he was sentenced to life imprisonment. The Supreme Court of Russia upheld the sentence.

He is serving his sentence in the "Polar Owl" colony.

In the media 
 Documentary film "Who will stop a maniac?" from the series by Vakhtang Mikeladze "Sentenced for life"

See also
 List of Russian serial killers

External links 
 Domestic serial killers of different years (late 20th-beginning of 21st century)
 Short maniac killed by Freud
 Pulp Fiction. For which the serial maniac from the Voronezh Oblast thanked the police
 Toptun on the "hunt". 10 years ago, a rapist maniac caused panic among the townspeople
 "Rossoshansky Maniac" sentenced to life imprisonment
 7 most bloodthirsty murderers of the Voronezh Oblast

1970 births
Kazakhstani emigrants to Russia
Living people
Male serial killers
People from Karaganda Region
Russian murderers of children
Russian people convicted of child sexual abuse
Russian rapists
Russian serial killers
Serial killers who worked in law enforcement